Paludibacter jiangxiensis  is a Gram-negative, obligately anaerobic, mesophilic, non-spore-forming and non-motile bacterium from the genus of Paludibacter which has been isolated from a rice field. It produces propionate and acetate from glucose fermentation and is classified as a saccharolytic fermenter.

References 

Bacteroidia
Bacteria described in 2016